Loxophlebia broteas is a moth of the subfamily Arctiinae. It was described by William Schaus in 1892. It is found in Santa Catarina, Brazil.

References

Loxophlebia
Moths described in 1892